The 2019–20 Los Angeles Clippers season was the 50th season of the franchise in the National Basketball Association (NBA), their 42nd season in Southern California, and their 36th season in Los Angeles.

On July 5, 2019, 2-time NBA champion, Finals MVP, and Defensive Player of the Year Kawhi Leonard agreed to join the Clippers, on the condition that the team trade for 6-time NBA All-Star Paul George from the Oklahoma City Thunder. Also during the offseason, they re-signed two-time NBA All-Defensive Team selection Patrick Beverley and three-time Sixth Man of the Year award winner Lou Williams. Entering the season, many analysts expected the Clippers to contend for an NBA championship.

Despite a nagging shoulder injury and "load management" policy that caused stars Paul George and Kawhi Leonard, respectively, to sit out multiple games, the Clippers were consistently at the top of the Western Conference standings. The Clippers improved on their 48–34 record last year after making the 8th seed in the Western Conference standings, finishing with a record of 49–23 (the equivalent of 56–26 in a full season) as the 2nd seed in the Western Conference, their highest seeded placement in franchise history. Kawhi Leonard was named a starter for the 2020 NBA All-Star Game by fans, current players, and media, and was later named the game's MVP. Montrezl Harrell won the 2019-20 NBA Sixth Man of the Year Award, joining Jamal Crawford and teammate Lou Williams as one of three players to win the award as members of the Clippers.

The season was suspended by the league officials following the games of March 11 after it was reported that Rudy Gobert tested positive for COVID-19. On July 5, the NBA announced a return of the season which would involve 22 teams playing in the NBA Bubble at the ESPN Wide World of Sports Complex at the Walt Disney World Resort in Florida. Each of the remaining 22 teams played eight seeding games to determine positioning for the NBA playoffs. Play resumed on July 30.

The Clippers had a 5-3 record for their bubble seeding games to earn the 2nd seed in the Western Conference and then faced off against the Dallas Mavericks in the first round of the playoffs. It was the first ever meeting between the two teams in the playoffs. The Clippers defeated the Mavericks in six games to win their first playoff series since 2015, advancing to the semifinals. In Game 5 of the series, the Clippers set a franchise record for scoring 154 points in the NBA Playoffs. The 154-point mark was the third most of any team in NBA playoff history. In the Conference Semifinals against the 3rd-seeded Denver Nuggets, the Clippers took a 3–1 series lead before ultimately losing in 7 games. The Clippers failed to hold double-digit leads in all three potential closeout games. Their elimination extends their drought of failing to reach the Conference Finals to 50 years, the longest amongst the four major professional sports leagues.

Following the Clippers' elimination from the playoffs, the team was roundly mocked on social media for their failure to win the championship. The 2019–20 Clippers team has since been viewed as having one of the greatest postseason collapses in NBA history.

The ensuing fallout from the Nuggets series caused Rivers to lose his position as head coach on September 28.

Draft

The Clippers hold no first-round picks but holds two second-round picks. The 56th pick was traded to the Brooklyn Nets along with a 2020 second round draft pick for Mfiondu Kabengele.

Roster

Standings

Division

Conference

Game log

Preseason

Regular season

|- style="background:#cfc;"
| 1
| October 22
| L. A. Lakers
| 
| Kawhi Leonard (30)
| Patrick Beverley (10)
| Lou Williams (7)
| Staples Center19,068
| 1–0
|- style="background:#cfc;"
| 2
| October 24
| @ Golden State
| 
| Lou Williams (22)
| Ivica Zubac (10)
| Kawhi Leonard (9)
| Chase Center18,064
| 2–0
|- style="background:#fcc;"
| 3
| October 26
| @ Phoenix
| 
| Kawhi Leonard (27)
| Kawhi Leonard (10)
| Kawhi Leonard (8)
| Talking Stick Resort Arena15,802
| 2–1
|- style="background:#cfc;"
| 4
| October 28
| Charlotte
| 
| Kawhi Leonard (30)
| Leonard, Harrell (7)
| Kawhi Leonard (6)
| Staples Center19,068
| 3–1
|- style="background:#fcc;"
| 5
| October 30
| @ Utah
| 
| Lou Williams (24)
| Zubac, Green (8)
| Terance Mann (5)
| Vivint Smart Home Arena18,306
| 3–2
|- style="background:#cfc;"
| 6
| October 31
| San Antonio
| 
| Kawhi Leonard (38)
| Kawhi Leonard (12)
| L.Williams, Beverley (5)
| Staples Center19,068
| 4–2

|- style="background:#cfc;"
| 7
| November 3
| Utah
| 
| Kawhi Leonard (30)
| Zubac, Beverley (9)
| Leonard, L.Williams, Beverley (3)
| Staples Center19,068
| 5–2
|- style="background:#fcc;"
| 8
| November 6
| Milwaukee
| 
| Harrell, L.Williams (34)
| Montrezl Harrell (13)
| Lou Williams (11)
| Staples Center19,068
| 5–3
|- style="background:#cfc;"
| 9
| November 7
| Portland
| 
| Kawhi Leonard (27)
| Leonard, Zubac (13)
| Lou Williams (8)
| Staples Center19,068
| 6–3
|- style="background:#cfc;"
| 10
| November 11
| Toronto
| 
| Lou Williams (21)
| Green, Beverley (12)
| Kawhi Leonard (9)
| Staples Center19,068
| 7–3
|- style="background:#fcc;"
| 11
| November 13
| @ Houston
| 
| Kawhi Leonard (26)
| JaMychal Green (14)
| Kawhi Leonard (7)
| Toyota Center18,055
| 7–4
|- style="background:#fcc;"
| 12
| November 14
| @ New Orleans
| 
| Paul George (33)
| Paul George (9)
| Lou Williams (9)
| Smoothie King Center17,147
| 7–5
|- style="background:#cfc;"
| 13
| November 16
| Atlanta
| 
| Paul George (37)
| Green, Zubac (9)
| Terance Mann (8)
| Staples Center19,068
| 8–5
|- style="background:#cfc;"
| 14
| November 18
| Oklahoma City
| 
| Montrezl Harrell (28)
| Montrezl Harrell (12)
| Lou Williams (9)
| Staples Center19,068
| 9–5
|- style="background:#cfc;"
| 15
| November 20
| Boston
| 
| Lou Williams (27)
| Patrick Beverley (16)
| Paul George (8)
| Staples Center19,068
| 10–5
|- style="background:#cfc;"
| 16
| November 22
| Houston
| 
| Lou Williams (26)
| JaMychal Green (9)
| Lou Williams (8)
| Staples Center19,068
| 11–5
|- style="background:#cfc;"
| 17
| November 24
| New Orleans
| 
| Montrezl Harrell (34)
| Montrezl Harrell (12)
| Kawhi Leonard (6)
| Staples Center19,068
| 12–5
|- style="background:#cfc;"
| 18
| November 26
| @ Dallas
| 
| Kawhi Leonard (28)
| Leonard, Green (8)
| Lou Williams (6)
| American Airlines Center20,407
| 13–5
|- style="background:#cfc;"
| 19
| November 27
| @ Memphis
| 
| Harrell, L.Williams (24)
| Montrezl Harrell (10)
| Lou Williams (13)
| FedExForum16,721
| 14–5
|- style="background:#fcc;"
| 20
| November 29
| @ San Antonio
| 
| Kawhi Leonard (19)
| George, Green (8)
| Leonard, L.Williams (7)
| AT&T Center18,354
| 14–6

|- style="background:#cfc;"
| 21
| December 1
| Washington
| 
| Kawhi Leonard (34)
| Montrezl Harrell (15)
| Lou Williams (8)
| Staples Center19,068
| 15–6
|- style="background:#cfc;"
| 22
| December 3
| Portland
| 
| Montrezl Harrell (26)
| Leonard, Harrell (9)
| Lou Williams (7)
| Staples Center19,068
| 16–6
|- style="background:#fcc;"
| 23
| December 6
| @ Milwaukee
| 
| Kawhi Leonard (17)
| Ivica Zubac (12)
| Kawhi Leonard (4)
| Fiserv Forum17,732
| 16–7
|- style="background:#cfc;"
| 24
| December 8
| @ Washington
| 
| Kawhi Leonard (34)
| Kawhi Leonard (11)
| George, L.Williams (6)
| Capital One Arena15,946
| 17–7
|- style="background:#cfc;"
| 25
| December 9
| @ Indiana
| 
| Paul George (36)
| Maurice Harkless (14)
| Lou Williams (6)
| Bankers Life Fieldhouse14,644
| 18–7
|- style="background:#cfc;"
| 26
| December 11
| @ Toronto
| 
| Kawhi Leonard (23)
| Ivica Zubac (8)
| Lou Williams (8)
| Scotiabank Arena20,144
| 19–7
|- style="background:#cfc;"
| 27
| December 13
| @ Minnesota
| 
| Paul George (46)
| Kawhi Leonard (11)
| Paul George (7)
| Target Center17,585
| 20–7
|- style="background:#fcc;"
| 28
| December 14
| @ Chicago
| 
| Montrezl Harrell (30)
| Montrezl Harrell (7)
| Paul George (6)
| United Center18,426
| 20–8
|- style="background:#cfc;"
| 29
| December 17
| Phoenix
| 
| Paul George (24)
| Rodney McGruder (11)
| Lou Williams (8)
| Staples Center19,068
| 21–8
|- style="background:#fcc;"
| 30
| December 19
| Houston
| 
| Paul George (34)
| George, Leonard (9)
| Patrick Beverley (7)
| Staples Center19,068
| 21–9
|- style="background:#cfc;"
| 31
| December 21
| @ San Antonio
| 
| Kawhi Leonard (26)
| Montrezl Harrell (8)
| Kawhi Leonard (9)
| AT&T Center18,354
| 22–9
|- style="background:#fcc;"
| 32
| December 22
| @ Oklahoma City
| 
| Lou Williams (22)
| Harrell, Zubac (8)
| Lou Williams (7)
| Chesapeake Energy Arena18,203
| 22–10
|- style="background:#cfc;"
| 33
| December 25
| @ L. A. Lakers
| 
| Kawhi Leonard (35)
| Kawhi Leonard (12)
| Lou Williams (7)
| Staples Center18,997
| 23–10
|- style="background:#fcc;"
| 34
| December 28
| Utah
| 
| Paul George (20)
| Ivica Zubac (12)
| Lou Williams (9)
| Staples Center19,068
| 23–11
|- style="background:#cfc;"
| 35
| December 31
| @ Sacramento
| 
| Kawhi Leonard (24)
| Ivica Zubac (13)
| Paul George (9)
| Golden 1 Center16,231
| 24–11

|- style="background:#cfc;"
| 36
| January 2
| Detroit
| 
| Montrezl Harrell (23)
| JaMychal Green (11)
| Shamet, Leonard, L.Williams  (5)
| Staples Center19,068
| 25–11
|- style="background:#fcc;"
| 37
| January 4
| Memphis
| 
| Montrezl Harrell (28)
| Ivica Zubac (11)
| Lou Williams  (7)
| Staples Center19,068
| 25–12
|- style="background:#cfc;"
| 38
| January 5
| New York
| 
| Montrezl Harrell (34)
| JaMychal Green (10)
| Lou Williams  (9)
| Staples Center19,068
| 26–12
|- style="background:#cfc;"
| 39
| January 10
| Golden State
| 
| Kawhi Leonard (36)
| Patrick Beverley (11)
| Patrick Beverley (9)
| Staples Center19,068
| 27–12
|- style="background:#fcc;"
| 40
| January 12
| @ Denver
| 
| Kawhi Leonard (30)
| Ivica Zubac (9)
| Patrick Beverley (7)
| Pepsi Center19,520
| 27–13
|- style="background:#cfc;"
| 41
| January 14
| Cleveland
| 
| Kawhi Leonard (43)
| Maurice Harkless (11)
| Patrick Beverley (9)
| Staples Center19,068
| 28–13
|- style="background:#cfc;"
| 42
| January 16
| Orlando
| 
| Kawhi Leonard (32)
| JaMychal Green (13)
| Patrick Beverley (7)
| Staples Center19,068
| 29–13
|- style="background:#cfc;"
| 43
| January 18
| @ New Orleans
| 
| Kawhi Leonard (39)
| Leonard, Beverley (6)
| Leonard, Beverley (6)
| Smoothie King Center17,959
| 30–13
|- style="background:#cfc;"
| 44
| January 21
| @ Dallas
| 
| Kawhi Leonard (36)
| Kawhi Leonard (11)
| L.Williams, Beverley (4)
| American Airlines Center19,783
| 31–13
|- style="background:#fcc;"
| 45
| January 22
| @ Atlanta
| 
| Montrezl Harrell (30)
| Montrezl Harrell (7)
| Lou Williams  (7)
| State Farm Arena14,338
| 31–14
|- style="background:#cfc;"
| 46
| January 24
| @ Miami
| 
| Kawhi Leonard (33)
| Montrezl Harrell (11)
| Kawhi Leonard (10)
| American Airlines Arena19,632
| 32–14
|- style="background:#cfc;"
| 47
| January 26
| @ Orlando
| 
| Kawhi Leonard (31)
| Kawhi Leonard (14)
| Kawhi Leonard (7)
| Amway Center15,427
| 33–14
|- style="background:#bbb;"
| —
| January 28
| @ LA Lakers
| colspan="6" | Postponed due to the Death of Kobe Bryant. Makeup date July 30 (Originally April 9).
|- style="background:#fcc;"
| 48
| January 30
| Sacramento
| 
| Lou Williams (22)
| Ivica Zubac (10)
| Lou Williams (6)
| Staples Center19,068
| 33–15

|- style="background:#cfc;"
| 49
| February 1
| Minnesota
| 
| Kawhi Leonard (31)
| Ivica Zubac (10)
| Lou Williams (6)
| Staples Center19,068
| 34–15
|- style="background:#cfc;"
| 50
| February 3
| San Antonio
| 
| Kawhi Leonard (22)
| Paul George (12)
| Paul George (8)
| Staples Center19,068
| 35–15
|- style="background:#cfc;"
| 51
| February 5
| Miami
| 
| George, Shamet (23)
| Ivica Zubac (8)
| Paul George (10)
| Staples Center19,068
| 36–15
|- style="background:#fcc;"
| 52
| February 8
| @ Minnesota
| 
| Kawhi Leonard (29)
| Ivica Zubac (8)
| Mann, L.Williams (5)
| Target Center18,978
| 36–16
|- style="background:#cfc;"
| 53
| February 9
| @ Cleveland
| 
| Lou Williams (25)
| Montrezl Harrell (9)
| George, McGruder, Zubac (4)
| Rocket Mortgage FieldHouse17,240
| 37–16
|- style="background:#fcc;"
| 54
| February 11
| @ Philadelphia
| 
| Kawhi Leonard (30)
| Paul George (12)
| Kawhi Leonard (9)
| Wells Fargo Center20,730
| 37–17
|- style="background:#fcc;"
| 55
| February 13
| @ Boston
| 
| Lou Williams (35)
| Montrezl Harrell (13)
| Lou Williams (8)
| TD Garden19,156
| 37–18
|- style="background:#fcc;"
| 56
| February 22
| Sacramento
| 
| Kawhi Leonard (31)
| Ivica Zubac (15)
| Kawhi Leonard (5)
| Staples Center19,068
| 37–19
|- style="background:#cfc;"
| 57
| February 24
| Memphis
| 
| Kawhi Leonard (25)
| Ivica Zubac (10)
| Jackson, L.Williams (6)
| Staples Center19,068
| 38–19
|- style="background:#cfc;"
| 58
| February 26
| @ Phoenix
| 
| Kawhi Leonard (24)
| Kawhi Leonard (14)
| Kawhi Leonard (5)
| Talking Stick Resort Arena15,157
| 39–19
|- style="background:#cfc;"
| 59
| February 28
| Denver
| 
| Paul George (24)
| Montrezl Harrell (10)
| Jackson, L.Williams (7)
| Staples Center19,068
| 40–19

|- style="background:#cfc;"
| 60
| March 1
| Philadelphia
| 
| Kawhi Leonard (30)
| Montrezl Harrell (9)
| Lou Williams (8)
| Staples Center19,068
| 41–19
|- style="background:#cfc;"
| 61
| March 3
| @ Oklahoma City
| 
| Kawhi Leonard (25)
| Kawhi Leonard (8)
| Lou Williams (4)
| Chesapeake Energy Arena18,203
| 42–19
|- style="background:#cfc;"
| 62
| March 5
| @ Houston
| 
| Kawhi Leonard (25)
| Ivica Zubac (12)
| Paul George (7)
| Toyota Center18,055
| 43–19
|- style="background:#fcc;"
| 63
| March 8
| L. A. Lakers
| 
| Paul George (31)
| Montrezl Harrell (8)
| George, Williams (3)
| Staples Center19,068
| 43–20
|- style="background:#cfc;"
| 64
| March 10
| @ Golden State
| 
| Kawhi Leonard (23)
| Ivica Zubac (12)
| Leonard, George, Shamet (5)
| Chase Center18,064
| 44–20

|- style="background:#fcc;"
| 65
| July 30
| @ L. A. Lakers
| 
| Paul George (30)
| Reggie Jackson (6)
| Jackson, Leonard (4)
| The ArenaNo In-Person Attendance
| 44–21
|- style="background:#cfc;"
| 66
| August 1
| New Orleans
| 
| Paul George (28)
| Ivica Zubac (9)
| Kawhi Leonard (5)
| HP Field HouseNo In-Person Attendance
| 45–21
|- style="background:#fcc;"
| 67
| August 4
| Phoenix
| 
| Kawhi Leonard (27)
| Ivica Zubac (12)
| Lou Williams (6)
| The ArenaNo In-Person Attendance
| 45–22
|- style="background:#cfc;"
| 68
| August 6
| @ Dallas
| 
| Kawhi Leonard (29)
| Ivica Zubac (15) 
| Paul George (6) 
| HP Field HouseNo In-Person Attendance
| 46–22
|- style="background:#cfc;"
| 69
| August 8
| @ Portland
| 
| Paul George (21)
| Ivica Zubac (12)
| Reggie Jackson (5)
| HP Field HouseNo In-Person Attendance
| 47–22
|- style="background:#fcc;"
| 70
| August 9
| Brooklyn
| 
| Kawhi Leonard (39)
| Ivica Zubac (15)
| Kawhi Leonard (6)
| The ArenaNo In-Person Attendance
| 47–23
|- style="background:#cfc;"
| 71
| August 12
| @ Denver
| 
| Paul George (27)
| Ivica Zubac (12)
| Lou Williams (7)
| The ArenaNo In-Person Attendance
| 48–23
|- style="background:#cfc;"
| 72
| August 14
| Oklahoma City
| 
| Terance Mann (25)
| Mann, Patterson (14)
| Terance Mann (9)
| HP Field HouseNo In-Person Attendance
| 49–23

|- style="background:#;"
| 65
| March 13
| Brooklyn
| 
| 
| 
| 
| Staples Center
| 
|- style="background:#;"
| 66
| March 14
| New Orleans
| 
| 
| 
| 
| Staples Center
| 
|- style="background:#;"
| 67
| March 16
| Dallas
| 
| 
| 
| 
| Staples Center
| 
|- style="background:#;"
| 68
| March 18
| @ Denver
| 
| 
| 
| 
| Pepsi Center
| 
|- style="background:#;"
| 69
| March 20
| Phoenix
| 
| 
| 
| 
| Staples Center
| 
|- style="background:#;"
| 70
| March 23
| @ New York
| 
| 
| 
| 
| Madison Square Garden
| 
|- style="background:#;"
| 71
| March 25
| @ Brooklyn
| 
| 
| 
| 
| Barclays Center
| 
|- style="background:#;"
| 72
| March 27
| @ Detroit
| 
| 
| 
| 
| Little Caesars Arena
| 
|- style="background:#;"
| 73
| March 28
| @ Charlotte
| 
| 
| 
| 
| Spectrum Center
| 
|- style="background:#;"
| 74
| March 30
| Indiana
| 
| 
| 
| 
| Staples Center
| 
|- style="background:#;"
| 75
| April 2
| @ Sacramento
| 
| 
| 
| 
| Golden 1 Center
| 
|- style="background:#;"
| 76
| April 4
| Oklahoma City
| 
| 
| 
| 
| Staples Center
| 
|- style="background:#;"
| 77
| April 6
| Chicago
| 
| 
| 
| 
| Staples Center
| 
|- style="background:#;"
| 78
| April 7
| @ Utah
| 
| 
| 
| 
| Vivint Smart Home Arena
| 
|- style="background:#;"
| 79
| April 9
| @ LA Lakers
| 
| 
| 
| 
| Staples Center
| 
|- style="background:#;"
| 80
| April 11
| Golden State
| 
| 
| 
| 
| Staples Center
| 
|- style="background:#;"
| 81
| April 13
| Minnesota
| 
| 
| 
| 
| Staples Center
| 
|- style="background:#;"
| 82
| April 15
| @ Portland
| 
| 
| 
| 
| Moda Center
|

Playoffs 

|- bgcolor=#cfc
| 1
| August 17
| Dallas
| 
| Kawhi Leonard (29)
| Kawhi Leonard (12)
| Kawhi Leonard (6)
| The ArenaNo In-Person Attendance
| 1–0
|- bgcolor=#fcc
| 2
| August 19
| Dallas
| 
| Kawhi Leonard (35)
| Leonard, George (10)
| Lou Williams (7)
| The ArenaNo In-Person Attendance
| 1–1
|- bgcolor=#cfc
| 3
| August 21
| @ Dallas
| 
| Kawhi Leonard (36)
| Leonard, George (9)
| Kawhi Leonard (8)
| The ArenaNo In-Person Attendance
| 2–1
|- bgcolor=#fcc
| 4
| August 23
| @ Dallas
| 
| Lou Williams (36)
| Kawhi Leonard (9)
| Lou Williams (5)
| The ArenaNo In-Person Attendance
| 2–2
|- bgcolor=#cfc
| 5
| August 25
| Dallas
| 
| Paul George (35)
| Montrezl Harrell (11)
| Reggie Jackson (5)
| The ArenaNo In-Person Attendance
| 3–2
|- bgcolor=#cfc
| 6
| August 30
| @ Dallas
| 
| Kawhi Leonard (33)
| Kawhi Leonard (14)
| George, Leonard (7)
| The ArenaNo In-Person Attendance
| 4–2

|- style="background:#cfc;"
| 1
| September 3
| Denver
| 
| Kawhi Leonard (29)
| George, Green, Zubac (7)
| George, Williams (4)
| AdventHealth ArenaNo in-person attendance
| 1–0
|- style="background:#fcc;"
| 2
| September 5
| Denver
| 
| Paul George (22)
| JaMychal Green (11)
| Kawhi Leonard (8)
| AdventHealth ArenaNo in-person attendance
| 1–1
|- style="background:#cfc;"
| 3
| September 7
| @ Denver
| 
| Paul George (32)
| Kawhi Leonard (14)
| Kawhi Leonard (6)
| AdventHealth ArenaNo in-person attendance
| 2–1
|- style="background:#cfc;"
| 4
| September 9
| @ Denver
| 
| Kawhi Leonard (30)
| Kawhi Leonard (11)
| Kawhi Leonard (9)
| AdventHealth ArenaNo in-person attendance
| 3–1
|- style="background:#fcc;"
| 5
| September 11
| Denver
| 
| Kawhi Leonard (36)
| Leonard, Zubac (9)
| Paul George (6)
| HP Field HouseNo in-person attendance
| 3–2
|- style="background:#fcc;"
| 6
| September 13
| @ Denver
| 
| Paul George (33)
| Ivica Zubac (12)
| Kawhi Leonard (5)
| AdventHealth ArenaNo in-person attendance
| 3–3
|- style="background:#fcc;"
| 7
| September 15
| Denver
| 
| Montrezl Harrell (20)
| Green, Leonard, Morris (6)
| Beverley, Leonard, Williams (6)
| AdventHealth ArenaNo in-person attendance
| 3–4

Transactions

Overview

Trades

Free agency

Re-signed

Additions

Subtractions

Notes

References

Los Angeles Clippers seasons
Los Angeles Clippers
Clippers
Los Angeles Clippers
Clippers
Los Angeles Clippers